BKQ could refer to:

 Bakairi language; ISO 639-3 language code: bkq
 Blackall Airport, Australia; IATA airport code BKQ
 Hamilton Square railway station, England; National Rail station code BKQ